Jared Palmer and Jeff Tarango were the defending champions, but Palmer did not participate this year.  Tarango partnered Yevgeny Kafelnikov, losing in the first round.

Justin Gimelstob and Daniel Vacek won the title, defeating Andriy Medvedev and Marat Safin 6–2, 6–1 in the final.

Seeds

Draw

Draw

External links
Draw

Kremlin Cup
Kremlin Cup